John Nutt was a 17th-century English pirate.

John Nutt may also refer to:

John Nutt (politician) (1605–1668), English Member of Parliament
John Nutt (printer) (died 1716), English printer and bookseller

See also
Nutt, a surname, including a list of people with the name